Cyropolis was town in Media Atropatene, between the rivers Cyrus and Amardus. The town is reported by Ptolemy and Ammianus Marcellinus. Claudius Salmasius (in Solin. p. 840) has denied the separate existence of this town, and contends that it is the same, as Cyreschata on the Jaxartes, also called Cyropolis, asserting that the authority of Ammianus is of no weight, as he generally follows Ptolemy. There seems, to William Smith, the foremost British classicist of the 19th century, no great force in this argument, and, if there were any district in which one might naturally expect to find a city called after Cyrus, it would surely be that with which he was immediately connected during his whole life.

References

Former populated places in Iran
Cyrus the Great
Cadusii
Atropatene